Jeannette Corbiere Lavell  (born June 21, 1942) is a Canadian and Anishinaabe community worker who focused on women's and children's rights. In 2018, she was honoured as a member of the Order of Canada.

Biography
She was born Jeannette Vivian Corbiere in Wikwemikong, Ontario to Adam and Rita Corbiere. Her mother, a school teacher, was a cofounder of the Wikwemikong "Wiky" Powwow. Corbiere Lavell learned English from her mother and Ojibwe from her father. Corbiere Lavell attended business college in North Bay. After graduation, she worked for the Native Canadian Centre of Toronto as an executive secretary. She was associated with the Company of Young Canadians, which gave her an opportunity to travel around the country, and was named, in 1965, as "Indian Princess of Canada".

Corbiere Lavell married David Lavell in 1970, a non-Indigenous man, and subsequently was no longer deemed an Indian according to the Indian Act. She challenged the Act in 1971; though her challenge failed, she inspired a later challenge, the success of which "permitted reinstatement of the First Nations women and children who had lost their status". She later served as president of the Native Women's Association of Canada and founded the Ontario Native Women's Association of Canada. Corbiere Lavell served as a cabinet appointee or the Commission on the Native Justice System, president or the Nishnawbe Institute, and president of Anduhyaun Inc. After she earned a teaching degree from the University of Western Ontario, she worked as a teacher and school principal. She co-edited "Until Our Hearts Are On the Ground: Aboriginal Mothering, Oppression, Resistance and Rebirth".

Her daughter, Dawn Harvard, was the youngest ever president of the Ontario Native Women's Association. That organization established an award in honour of Corbiere Lavell in 1987.

In September 2009, she became the president of the organization NWAC (Native Women's Association of Canada) for a three-years period.

In 2016, Corbiere Lavell was awarded an honorary doctorate of laws at York University for her work as a Native women's rights activist and educator.

In April 2018 The Feminist Alliance for International Action recognized Jeannette as a member of the Indigenous Famous Six. Other members are Yvonne Bedard, Senator Sandra Lovelace Nicholas, Sharon McIvor, Lynn Gehl, and Senator Lillian Dyck.

Awards
 Persons Award (2009)
 Queen Elizabeth II Diamond Jubilee Medal (2012)
 Member of the Order of Canada (2017)
Indspire Award, Lifetime Achievement (2020)

See also
 Canada (AG) v Lavell

References

1942 births
Governor General's Award in Commemoration of the Persons Case winners
Canadian women's rights activists
People from Manitoulin Island
Living people
Canadian book editors
Heads of schools in Canada
First Nations women
First Nations activists
Ojibwe people
Members of the Order of Canada